Valentim da Fonseca e Silva (ca. 1745 – March 2, 1813), better known as Mestre Valentim, was a Brazilian sculptor and urban planner. Like Antonio Francisco Lisboa, also known as Aleijadinho, he is one of the most famous artists of colonial Brazil and was of mixed race. Mestre Valentim recounts details of his life in his testament. He was born in Serro do Frio to Manoel da Fonseca e Silva, a white man, and Amatilde da Fonseca, a black woman. Although he never married, his relationship with Josefa Maria da Conceição resulted in a daughter named Joana. Although the details of his artistic training are up to debate, he may have traveled to Portugal with his family as a child. By adulthood, he found himself living and working in Rio de Janeiro.

Career 

He began his career as a sculptor, and numerous sculptural works within Rio de Janeiro's churches have been attributed to him. He was also instrumental in creating a foundry and in producing the first large-scale bronze cast sculptures made in Brazil.

Exceptional for an artist of color in colonial Brazil, Mestre Valentim became an architect. He received numerous commissions from the viceroy Dom Luiz de Vasconcelos e Souza. Also unusual for a colonial Brazilian artist is the fact that a portrait painted during his lifetime still exists today. João Francisco Muzzi's painting includes Mestre Valentim presenting architectural plans to the viceroy. 

One of his most ambitious projects was the design of the Passeio Público of Rio de Janeiro, the first public park in Brazil. The sculptural works of the park include stylized entrance gates; two obelisks; statutes of Greek gods and Brazilian plants and animals; and several fountains. The park featured two pavilions containing paintings by Leandro Joaquim (1738–1798). Unfortunately, most of Mestre Valentim's design has since been altered, many of the sculptures removed, and the pavilions eliminated.

Works 
Igreja de Nossa Senhora da Conceição e Boa Morte

Mosteiro de São Bento

Igreja da Ordem Terceira do Carmo

Igreja de São Francisco de PaulaRecolhimento de Nossa Senhora do Parto

Passeio Público (Rio de Janeiro)

References

Further reading 

Edward J. Sullivan, “The Black Hand: Notes on the African Presence in the Visual Arts of Brazil and the Caribbean,” in Joseph J. Rishel and Suzanne Stratton-Pruitt eds., The Arts of Latin America 1492-1820 (Philadelphia: Philadelphia Museum of Art, 2006), pp. 39–55.

Rachel Zimmerman, "Mestre Valentim, Passeio Publico, Rio de Janeiro," in Smarthistory, May 19, 2019, https://smarthistory.org/valentim-passeio-publico/.

1745 births
1813 deaths
People from Minas Gerais
People from Rio de Janeiro (city)
Architects of cathedrals
Brazilian architects
Brazilian urban planners